Ömer Kahveci (born 15 February 1992) is a Turkish professional footballer who currently plays as a goalkeeper for Manisa FK. He is also a youth international, having been capped at the Turkey U-17 and U-18 levels.

Career

Club career
Kahveci began his career with Cesurspor in 2004. Adana Demirspor transferred him in 2005, and was he promoted to the senior team in 2007. He was transferred to Bucaspor in 2010.

International career
Kahveci represented Turkey at the 2009 FIFA U-17 World Cup and 2011 UEFA European Under-19 Championship.

References

External links
 
 
 

1992 births
Living people
Turkish footballers
Turkey under-21 international footballers
Turkey youth international footballers
Adana Demirspor footballers
Bucaspor footballers
Şanlıurfaspor footballers
Manisa FK footballers
Süper Lig players
TFF First League players
Association football goalkeepers